The Love This Giant Tour was a joint tour by American musicians David Byrne and St. Vincent. It started on 15 September 2012 in Minneapolis, United States, and ended on 12 September 2013 in Florence, Italy, after 74 concerts on 14 countries and 3 continents. The tour was officially announced along with Love This Giant, the album it promoted, on 14 June 2012. On the stage, they were accompanied by a backing band consisting of eight brass players, a keyboardist and a drummer. The performers engaged in complex choreography onstage while performing.

Set list 
The following set list was obtained from the concert held on 29 September 2012 at Williamsburg Park in New York City. It does not represent all concerts for the duration of the tour. 

 "Who"
 "Weekend in the Dust"
 "Save Me from What I Want" (St. Vincent song)
 "Strange Overtones" (David Byrne & Brian Eno song)
 "I am an Ape"
 "Marrow" (St. Vincent song)
 "This Must Be the Place (Naive Melody)" (Talking Heads song)
 "The Forest Awakes"
 "Ice Age"
 "Like Humans Do" (David Byrne song)
 "Lightning"
 "Lazarus"
 "Cheerleader" (St. Vincent song)
 "Lazy" (X-Press 2 song featuring David Byrne) 
 "I Should Watch TV"
 "Northern Lights" (St. Vincent song)
 "The One Who Broke Your Heart"
 "Outside of Space and Time"
Encore
 "Cruel" (St. Vincent song)
 "Burning Down the House" (Talking Heads song)
Second encore
 "The Party" (St. Vincent song)
 "Road to Nowhere" (Talking Heads song)

Tour dates

Cancelled shows

Notes

Personnel

Credits adapted from the NPR website.

Band

 David Byrne – Vocals, Guitar, Natural Trumpet, Theremin
 St. Vincent – Vocals, Guitar, Electronic Drums, Theremin
 Daniel Mintseris – Keyboards, Musical Director
 Brian Wolfe – Drums
 Kelly Pratt – Trumpet, Flugelhorn, French Horn, Flute
 Dave Nelson – Trombone
 Jon Natchez – Clarinet, Flute, Saxophone
 Bryan Murray – Clarinet, Flute, Saxophone
 Rachel Drehmann – French Horn
 Jason Disu – Trombone
 John Altieri – Sousaphone, Tuba
 Carter Yasutake – Trumpet, Flugelhorn

Choreographers
 Annie-B Parson – Choreographer

References

2012 concert tours
2013 concert tours
David Byrne concert tours
St. Vincent (musician) concert tours